Robert Tinley was an English Anglican priest.

Tinley was born in Kent and was educated at Magdalen College, Oxford where he became a fellow. He held livings at Witham, Glemsford Duxford and Cottenham.  He was archdeacon of Cambridge from 1600 until his death in 1616.

References

1616 deaths
Alumni of Magdalen College, Oxford
Archdeacons of Cambridge
17th-century English Anglican priests